Ateralphus is a genus of beetles in the family Cerambycidae, containing the following species:

 Ateralphus dejeani (Lane, 1973)
 Ateralphus javariensis (Lane, 1965)
 Ateralphus lacteus Galileo & Martins, 2006
 Ateralphus senilis (Bates, 1862)
 Ateralphus subsellatus (White, 1855)
 Ateralphus variegatus (Mendes, 1938)

References

Acanthoderini